Northwind Glacier is a large Antarctic glacier; one of the major sources of the Fry Glacier, in the Convoy Range, Victoria Land. The glacier drains the west part of Flight Deck Neve and flows north between Elkhorn Ridge and Sunker Nunataks to Fry Glacier. A lobe of the glacier flows west a short distance into the mouth of Greenville Valley. Named by the New Zealand Northern Survey Party (1956–57) of the Commonwealth Trans-Antarctic Expedition after the USCGC Northwind (WAGB-282),  an icebreaker in the main American convoy into McMurdo Sound during Operation Deep Freeze 2 that season.

Glaciers of Victoria Land
Scott Coast